The 1987–88 Washington Capitals season was the Washington Capitals 14th season in the National Hockey League (NHL).

Regular season

The Capitals had the most shutouts in the league with six and were the least penalized team in the league, being short-handed only 394 times.

Final standings

Schedule and results

Playoffs

Defenseman Garry Galley's crucial two-goal performance tied the regular season finale with Philadelphia, meant that Washington won the head-to-head tiebreaker and finished second in the Patrick Division, giving them home-ice advantage in their first-round match-up with the defending division and Wales Conference champion Flyers.

Philly showed a champion's mettle right away, though, stealing home ice away with a 4–2 victory in Game 1. Ron Hextall made 35 saves and Dave Poulin's 3rd period power play tally broke a 2–2 tie. Washington salvaged a split at home with a 5-4 triumph in Game 2. Despite letting in a quartet of Philly goals, Pete Peeters proved to be the final period hero, stopping 14 of 15 shots from a pressing Flyers attack.

Philadelphia then turned the tables back at their place, taking a pair of one-goal games, both of them high in drama for entirely different reasons. In Game 3, a 4–3 Flyers win, officials handed out 40 penalties, including 10 major/misconduct penalties. After the game Philly forward Rick Tocchet, who spent roughly half the contest in the penalty box, was quoted as saying, "There are 10 guys on that team that I'd like to kill."

The rivalry heated up further in Game 4 as both teams tried to change momentum with goalie switches. The Capitals yanked Peeters in favor of starting Clint Malarchuk, who had played more during the regular season. Despite missing starting defenseman Scott Stevens and team captain Rod Langway, who were injured in Game 3, the move seemed to be paying dividends as Washington took a 4–1 lead with 17:00 to go, resulting in Hextall's removal for backup Mark Laforest. The Caps maintained their 3-goal advantage into the final 9:00 of the game, when the Flyers began one of their most riveting comebacks in franchise history. Mark Howe and Brian Propp scored to cut the deficit to one and then, after pulling their new netminder, the tying tally came from defenseman Kjell Samuelsson with :53 remaining. The Flyers completed the comeback when Murray Craven lit the lamp just 1:18 into overtime, giving them a 5–4 win for Philly. Howe said after, "If we play that game 250 times, we win it once."

Now facing elimination, the Capitals returned home and showed no fear as they again knocked Hextall out of the game after posting a 4–1 lead, but this time it only took 29 minutes. Washington went on to win easily this time, 5-2. The final Philadelphia goal came on a power play in the second period after the team asked to check goalie Pete Peeters' stick, which was ruled to be wider than permitted by the rules. Peeters admitted all his sticks were the same and so he had to use one of backup Clint Malarchuk's sticks for the rest of the game.

The Flyers now had a chance to clinch the series at home in Game 6, which would be another penalty-filled contest. It was highlighted (or lowlighted, depending on your point of view) by Philadelphia defenseman Greg Smyth spending 27 minutes in the sin bin. Given all the infractions, it was no surprise that the difference in the game was special teams. While Philadelphia went a pedestrian 1-for-8 on the power play, Washington was a scintillating 4-of-9. The key play in the game was Flyers forward Dave Brown trying to fight Caps counterpart Bob Gould. However, assistant captain Gould shrewdly went turtle, covering up, and letting Brown whale on him a couple times before officials stepped in. Gould went back to the bench as Brown's fighting major gave the Capitals, who were already ahead 2–0, a 5:00 power play, during which they scored twice to blow the game open. Washington romped to a 7–2 triumph with 7 different goal scorers to set up the 7th and deciding game back in D.C.

In a series full of twists and turns (some of them being highly illegal and downright nasty), the final turn of them all came in one of the more exciting Game 7's in Stanley Cup playoff history. But first, one last bit of nasty had to be doled out. During a Flyer power play late in a scoreless first period, Capitals defenseman Grant Ledyard didn't like the way Flyers forward Rick Tocchet checked him to the ice in front of the Washington goal. Ledyard promptly speared Tocchet in the groin with the blade of his stick and received a 5-minute major and a game misconduct. Tim Kerr scored during the Ledyard penalty, giving the Flyers a 1–0 lead after the 1st period.

Things went from bad to worse for the Caps as the 1-goal deficit was tripled less than 3:00 into the 2nd period on markers by Brian Propp and Mark Howe. Just like Game 4, one team had a 3-goal lead and all the momentum. But momentum's a funny thing. It changed four minutes later when Dale Hunter, who was picked up in the offseason from the Quebec Nordiques, fired a backwards cross-ice pass to a wide open Garry Galley who beat Ron Hextall with a slapshot. With the Capital Centre crowd now in full throat, Washington kept up the pressure and forced an icing and an offensive zone faceoff. Mike Ridley dueled with Peter Zezel and the puck was kicked and dribbled right in front of the crease where Kelly Miller stuffed it under Hextall's pads. Two goals in about 90 seconds and it was a brand new hockey game.

But just when the actual play on the ice looked to be returning to center stage, tempers flared again. As the Caps rushed up ice for the tying goal, forward Dave Christian fired a high shot that Hextall jumped to try to corral on his chest, Washington defenseman Kevin Hatcher, charging the net for a rebound, lowered the boom and ran right over the Flyer netminder, earning him a minor penalty and putting the three officials quickly to work to break up the players before any punches could be thrown. Hatcher would atone for his mistake before the period was out.

Philadelphia tried to clear from their defensive half-wall, but failed to flip the puck over the 6'3" defenseman. Hatcher gloved it down at the blue line and walked in to fire a wicked slapshot that beat Hextall shortside to tie the game. Just as Philadelphia needed less than twenty minutes to erase a 3-goal deficit in Game 4, Washington had done the same in Game 7. However, there was still a whole 3rd period to go.

Just over 5:00 into the 3rd, Kjell Samuelsson was sent off the ice for tripping Peter Sundström. Washington was so potent in the previous game with the man advantage, but had failed to score in this contest despite over  minutes of power play time. They apparently didn't want to waste any more. The Caps won the offensive zone faceoff and Hatcher took the puck and passed across the blue line to Garry Galley. Galley fired low at the target, but Dale Hunter stopped the attempt about halfway to the net and re-shot the puck. Hextall, already down trying to catch the Galley shot, didn't have a chance to readjust. The light went on and the Capitals had taken a 4–3 lead with just under 15:00 to go, needing only 6 seconds of their power play to score.

But Philadelphia was not about to go quietly. Just over a minute later, the Flyers won a faceoff in their offensive zone and the puck came back to defenseman Brad Marsh who fired a low shot that somehow found its way through the legs and sticks of a half-dozen players before zooming past Peeters and into the net for the tying goal. Again, initiation was the sincerest form of flattery in this series, although it had been defined by flattening throughout. Both defenses tightened up and very few scoring chances came for the rest of regulation and the game went to overtime tied 4–4.

Having already lost one dramatic overtime game in the series and still stinging from the heartbreak of the previous season's quadruple-overtime playoff loss at home in Game 7 in the famed Easter Epic (rated the #7 game in New York Islanders history), Capitals fans were not relishing bonus hockey. Adding to the uncertainty was whether all the bad blood that had been spilled in this series might dramatically affect the outcome. No one knew how this one was going to end.

It almost ended in less than 5 seconds. Philadelphia won the opening faceoff and Mark Howe skated across the red line and fired a long, high slapshot. Pete Peeters reached up to catch it, but the puck deflected off his glove and came down just high and wide of the goal. Neither team had a real decent scoring opportunity, though, until a Washington defensive clear wound up springing Mike Gartner on a breakaway. As the Caps leading goal scorer tried to catch up to the pass, he was hooked down from behind by Mark Howe, giving the Capitals a rare overtime power play.

Washington had Hextall out of position three times early in the man advantage but couldn't get a clean shot away. Then, as things looked to be cooling off, Scott Stevens was taken down, but still managed to get the puck over to Mike Ridley on the left side. He slid it back to Gartner who was all alone 10 feet in front of the net. Gartner's shot beat Hextall clean glove-side-high, but didn't beat the crossbar, marking the third time in the game the iron had repelled a Washington scoring chance. Adding insult to, well, insult, the rebound then dropped almost straight down into the crease where it bounced over Dale Hunter's sweeping stick, which had nothing between it and the open net. The ensuing chaotic scramble would send Philly's Brian Propp on a shorthanded breakaway down the right wing. His first shot found the right pad of Peeters, and his rebound attempt was scooped by Peeters' glove.

Less than a minute later, Gartner was sprung again by Ridley down his favored right wing.  Gartner beat one defenseman, drew the second one to him, and then sent a perfect pass across to Peter Sundstrom.  The redirect was on target, but Hextall somehow got back to make arguably his best save of the series, robbing Sundstrom from point-blank range.  Washington kept the pressure on and about a minute later almost won it again, this time it was Hunter from behind the net setting up Bobby Gould, whose backhand one-timer from just above the crease was kicked out by Hextall's stick.

Gould got another shot after Washington retrieved Philadelphia's clear and Murray Craven skated the loose puck out of the Flyer zone.  He got as far as the Caps blue line where he was poke-checked by Larry Murphy. Craven tried to return the favor as he went off the ice for a line change, but the puck bounced off Scott Stevens' skate and came right back to Murphy. That's when Murphy looked up and saw Hunter making a hard u-turn just past the red line with his stick raised. Hunter perfectly split three Flyers and Murphy hit him in stride right at the blue line.  Hunter cruised in and later said he didn't know what he was going to do until the last moment when he saw an opening between Hextall's pads.  The man who six years earlier won a deciding Game 5 (best-of-5 series) for Quebec with an overtime goal against Montreal, feathered a slithering shot that hit the back of the net 5:57 into overtime, giving the Capitals a thrilling 5–4 victory and a 4–3 series triumph.

The game would not only be one of the most disheartening and gut-wrenching for Flyer fans, it would also be the last for Philadelphia's young crackerjack head coach Mike Keenan, who left in the offseason to take the head job with the Chicago Blackhawks.

As for Washington, the victory was recently voted the #1 game in the history of the franchise.

Second round 
The historic win did not propel the Capitals very far.  Facing the New Jersey Devils in the Patrick Division Finals, Washington again cannot keep their home ice advantage. After winning Game 1 3–1 behind 33 saves from Pete Peeters, the Capitals dropped Game 2 at home 5–2 as Aaron Broten had a hat trick for the Devils.

Jersey doubled their Game 2 score in Game 3, winning by a stunning 10–4 margin behind a pair of hat tricks. Mark Johnson scored 4 times and Peter Sundström's twin brother, Patrik, torched his sibling's squad with 3 goals and 5 assists, the 8 points setting a new Stanley Cup playoff record. Peeters was yanked after giving up 3 goals on just 10 shots in the first period, but replacement Clint Malarchuk did even worse, stopping only 14 of the 21 shots he faced.

Washington rebounded with a 4–1 win in Game 4 behind a pair of Dave Christian goals and coach Bryan Murray actually splitting time between his goalies. However, New Jersey stole Game 5 right back in D.C. by a 3–1 count as Bob Sauvé started in place of Sean Burke in net and stopped 28 shots.

Down 3-2 and facing elimination on the road, Washington impressively forced Game 7 with an eerily identical 7–2 victory from the previous series in which again, amazingly, 7 different Capitals scored, including power play goals from Gartner and Hunter.

This time, however, there was no magical comeback as John MacLean's tally proved to be the game winner in a 3–2 triumph that sent the Devils on to their first conference final. In a most unusual twist, the road team won 5 of the 7 games in the series.

As a final note, the playoffs ended in bizarre fashion. After a Game 3 loss to Boston in the Wales Conference Finals, New Jersey coach Jim Schoenfeld and referee Don Koharski got into a heated argument during which Koharski tripped and fell, accusing Schoenfeld of pushing him. Schoenfield famously responded, "You tripped and fell, you fat pig!"  Then, he added "Have another doughnut! Have another doughnut!"  Boston won the series in seven games and advance to face Edmonton in the finals. Schoenfeld was fired two years later and go on to coach the Capitals for four seasons in the mid-1990s.

Facing being swept at home in Game 4 of the finals, the Bruins apparently tried to use some of the Celtic magic their Boston Garden counterparts had made famous over the years. The sweltering heat outside resulted in the ice surface being shrouded in fog and slowed the vaunted Oiler attack. Then, the building suffered a power overload, plunging the Garden into darkness. The blackout was presumably caused by the air conditioning system short-circuiting from running on full power for too long. League rules stated that the game (which was tied at 3 in the 2nd period) had to be canceled and made up in Boston at the end of the series, if necessary, making it a 2–1–1–1–1–1 format. It wasn't necessary as Edmonton completed the rare 4-game sweep in 5 games with a 6–3 victory.

Player statistics

Regular season
Scoring

Goaltending

Playoffs
Scoring

Goaltending

Note: GP = Games played; G = Goals; A = Assists; Pts = Points; +/- = Plus/minus; PIM = Penalty minutes; PPG=Power-play goals; SHG=Short-handed goals; GWG=Game-winning goals
      MIN=Minutes played; W = Wins; L = Losses; T = Ties; GA = Goals against; GAA = Goals against average; SO = Shutouts; SA=Shots against; SV=Shots saved; SV% = Save percentage;

Draft picks
Washington's draft picks at the 1987 NHL Entry Draft held at the Joe Louis Arena in Detroit, Michigan.

See also
 1987–88 NHL season

References

External links
 

Wash
Wash
Washington Capitals seasons
Washing
Washing